Theodore Roosevelt V (born November 27, 1942), also called Theodore IV, is an American investment banker and managing director at Barclays Investment Bank. He is a member of the Council on Foreign Relations, the Economic Club of New York, and the Foreign Policy Association, and serves on the Advisory Council of Represent.Us, a nonpartisan anti-corruption organization. Roosevelt is also a prominent conservationist. His name suffix varies since President Roosevelt's father was Theodore Roosevelt Sr., though the same-named son did not commonly use a "Jr." name suffix.

Early years
Theodore Roosevelt V was born on November 27, 1942. He is the only son of Theodore Roosevelt IV (1914–2001) and Anne Mason Babcock (1917–2001).  He earned his bachelor's degree from Harvard University in 1965. At Harvard, he was a member of the Porcellian Club. In 1972, he earned an MBA from the Harvard Business School, where he was a member of the HBS Rugby Club.

Roosevelt is a great-grandson of President Theodore Roosevelt. As an Oyster Bay Roosevelt, and through his ancestor Cornelius Van Schaack Jr., he is a descendant of the Schuyler family. His maternal grandparents were George Wheeler Babcock (1879—1950) and Anne Mason Bonnycastle Robinson (1886—1923).

Career
After college, he was commissioned as an ensign in the U.S. Naval Reserve on June 16, 1965 and served as a U.S. Navy officer with Underwater Demolition Team 11 (BUD/S Class 36).  After completing BUDS he served for two years in Vietnam with the Navy SEALs. He remained in the Naval Reserve after leaving active duty and was promoted to lieutenant commander on April 1, 1974.

He would later then go onto serving in the U.S. State Department as a foreign service officer in Washington, D.C. and the Upper Volta.

Public service
Roosevelt is Chair of the Center for Climate and Energy Solutions, a Trustee of the Alliance for Climate Protection, a member of the Governing Council of The Wilderness Society (United States), and a Trustee for the American Museum of Natural History, the World Resources Institute, and The Cultural Institutions Retirement System. He is also a Counselor for the China–U.S. Center for Sustainable Development.  He sits on the Advisory Council of the nonpartisan anti-corruption organization Represent.Us, where he served as a consultant in the crafting of the American Anti-Corruption Act.

At the Republican Convention in 2000, Roosevelt delivered an address on the environment. He gave the keynote speech at the National Governors Association Annual Meeting in 2001 as well as the keynote address at the Governors Conference on Climate Change in April 2008 sponsored by Yale University. Most recently, he spoke at the Conference of Parties Climate Summit in December 2009 in Copenhagen sponsored by the European Union Parliament.

On April 18, 2016, the day before the New York Republican primary, Roosevelt endorsed Ohio Governor John Kasich for president of the United States.

Personal life
In 1970, Roosevelt married Constance Lane Rogers. They have one son, Theodore Roosevelt VI.

References

Further reading

External links

1942 births
American diplomats
American environmentalists
American investment bankers
American people of Dutch descent
American people of English descent
American people of French descent
American people of Scottish descent
American people of Welsh descent
Bulloch family
Harvard Business School alumni
Harvard University alumni
Lehman Brothers
Living people
New York (state) Republicans
People from Jacksonville, Florida
Theodore
Schuyler family
United States Navy SEALs personnel
Activists from New York (state)